This is a list of submissions to the 29th Academy Awards for Best Foreign Language Film. The Academy Award for Best Foreign Language Film was created in 1956 by the Academy of Motion Picture Arts and Sciences (AMPAS) to honour non-English-speaking films produced outside the United States. That year, AMPAS asked individual countries to submit their best films of the year for the inaugural Best Foreign Language Film Oscar. In previous years, the Foreign Language Oscar was not a regular award, and there were no nominees – a winner was simply announced at the Oscar ceremony. The award has since been handed out annually, and is accepted by the winning film's director, although it is considered an award for the submitting country as a whole. Countries are invited by the Academy to submit their best films for competition according to strict rules, with only one film being accepted from each country.

For the 29th Academy Awards, eight films were submitted in the category Academy Award for Best Foreign Language Film, and five of these were selected as Oscar nominees. The inaugural winner, Italy's La Strada, was announced at the Oscar ceremony, which took place on March 27, 1957.

Submissions

References

Sources
 Margaret Herrick Library, Academy of Motion Picture Arts and Sciences

29
1956 film awards
1957 film awards